Ruby was an American rock band that between 1976 and 1978 recorded two albums, Ruby and Rock & Roll Madness. In 1984, the compilation Precious Gems (which was credited to Tom Fogerty + Ruby) was released. In 1988, Randy Oda and Tom Fogerty made another album, Sidekicks, with Kevin Oda on drums, and Tom's son Jeff on bass; the album was not released until five years later, by which point Fogerty had died.

Personnel 
Tom Fogerty – guitar, harmonica, vocals
Randy Oda – guitar, keyboards, vocals
Anthony Davis – bass, vocals
Bobby Cochran – drums, percussions, vocals
(Ed Bogas performs the bass on "Baby, What You Want Me to Do" on the first album)

References 

Rock music groups from California
Musical groups established in 1976
Musical groups disestablished in 1984
Fantasy Records artists